Pappas Restaurants, Inc. or simply Pappas Restaurants is a privately held restaurant chain, headquartered in Houston, Texas. Its brands include Pappas Bros. Steakhouse, Pappas Seafood, Pappas Bar-B-Q, Pappas Burger, Pappadeaux Seafood Kitchen, Pappasito's, and Yia Yia Mary's.

Awards 
In the December 2007 issue of Texas Monthly, Pappas Bros. Steakhouse was named the best steakhouse in Texas.

Since 2010, Pappas Bros. Steakhouse Houston has been the recipient of the Wine Spectator Grand Award. Pappas Bros. Steakhouse Dallas has held the same award since 2011.

See also

 List of barbecue restaurants
 List of seafood restaurants
 Yia Yia Mary's

References

External links 
 Pappas Restaurants

Restaurants in Houston
Barbecue restaurants in the United States
Restaurants established in 1976
European-American culture in Houston
Greek-American culture in Texas
1976 establishments in Texas
Seafood restaurants in the United States